The Radio Television Digital News Association (RTDNA, pronounced the same as "rotunda"), formerly the Radio-Television News Directors Association (RTNDA), is a United States-based membership organization of radio, television, and online news directors, producers, executives, reporters, students and educators. Among its functions are the maintenance of journalistic ethics and the preservation of the free speech rights of broadcast journalists.

The RTDNA is known for the Edward R. Murrow Award, given annually since 1971 for excellence in electronic journalism, and the Paul White Award, presented annually since 1956 as its highest award, for lifetime achievement.

History
The RTDNA was founded in 1946 as the National Association of Radio News Editors. The association was the idea of John Hogan, radio news editor at WCSH in Portland, Maine, who initially thought of it in the spring of that year. The name was changed at the first convention of the new organization, becoming the National Association of Radio News Directors (NARND). At this meeting, Hogan was elected president of the newly renamed group.

In 1952, the group's willingness to accept name changes proved useful when they renamed themselves the Radio-Television News Directors Association (RTNDA). This change reflected the importance of television and welcomed members from Canada, Mexico, and other countries by removing the word "national." More recently, in early 2010, they updated their name to include the word "digital" to highlight that industry's growing significance.

It was founded as an industry group to set standards for the nascent field of broadcast journalism and to defend the First Amendment in instances where broadcast media was being threatened. 

Edward R. Murrow famously gave a speech at an RTNDA event held in his honor in 1958. The speech was harshly critical of the network television establishment of the day, and its emphasis on popular entertainment rather than news and public affairs programming. This speech was the cornerstone of the plot of the 2005 motion picture Good Night, and Good Luck.

Awards

Reporting Awards
Edward R. Murrow Awards

The Radio Television Digital News Association has been honoring outstanding achievements in electronic journalism with the Edward R. Murrow Awards since 1971.  Murrow's pursuit of excellence in journalism embodies the spirit of the awards that carry his name.  Murrow Award recipients demonstrate the excellence that Edward R. Murrow made a standard for the electronic news profession

Kaleidoscope Awards (formerly UNITY Awards)
 
RTDNA honors outstanding achievements in the coverage of diversity with the Kaleidoscope Awards The award was developed as part of RTDNA's commitment to achieve diversity in the newsroom through developing news content and editorial staffs that reflect the changing face of communities. The purpose of the award is to encourage and showcase journalistic excellence in covering issues of race, ethnicity, sexual orientation and gender identity. It is presented annually to news organizations that show an ongoing commitment to covering the diversity of the communities they serve.

NEFE Personal Finance Reporting Award

The Radio Television Digital News Association and the National Endowment for Financial Education work together to honor the very best in personal finance reporting.

The award is presented as part of the Money Matters resource. Money Matters is a tool to help journalists better cover stories about financial issues on television, radio and online. One television, radio, and online journalist each receive a $1,000 prize and an invitation to present at the Excellence in Journalism conference.

Gannett Foundation Al Neuharth Award for Investigative Journalism

The Radio Television Digital News Association partners with the Gannett Foundation to honor the very best in investigative reporting. The award recognizes groundbreaking work by a journalist or a staff that creatively used digital tools in the role of being a community's watchdog. Special consideration is given to journalism that helps a community understand and address important issues. The winner receives a $5,000 prize awarded at the Excellence in Journalism conference.

Lifetime Achievement Awards
Paul White Award

Named for the first news director of CBS, the Paul White Award is RTDNA's highest honor and recognizes an individual's lifetime contributions to electronic journalism. The Paul White Award is presented annually at the Excellence in Journalism conference and exhibition.

2021 Susan Zirinsky
2020 Byron Pitts
2019 Scott Pelley
2018 Bill Whitaker
2016 Charlie Rose
2015 Lesley Stahl
2014 Dick Ebersol
2013 Chris Wallace
2012 Jeff Fager
2011 Linda Ellerbee
2010 Steve Kroft
2009 Fred Young
2008 Sam Donaldson and Tim Russert (posthumously)
2007 Christiane Amanpour
2006 Charles Gibson
2005 Charles Osgood
2004 Ted Koppel
2003 Bob Schieffer
2002 Tom Brokaw
2001 Jim McKay
2000 Ed Bradley
1999 Tom Johnson
1998 Jane Pauley
1997 Dan Rather
1996 Bernard Shaw
1995 Peter Jennings
1994 Charles Kuralt
1993 Ed Bliss
1992 Paul Harvey
1991 Mike Wallace
1990 Robert MacNeil and Jim Lehrer
1989 R.E. "Ted" Turner
1988 Douglas Edwards
1987 Don Hewitt
1986 Fred Friendly
1985 Barbara Walters
1984 Ralph Renick
1983 John Chancellor
1982 David Brinkley
1981 Walter Cronkite
1980 Pauline Frederick
1979 Dick Salant
1978 Bill Monroe
1977 Eric Sevareid
1976 Ted Koop
1975 Elmer Lower
1974 Bill Small
1973 Julian Goodman
1972 Sam Ervin
1971 Dr. Frank Stanton
1970 Walter Cronkite
1969 Judge Herbert B. Walker
1968 W. Theodore Pierson
1967 Sol Taishoff
1966 Morley Safer
1965 Ralph Blumberg
1964 Edward R. Murrow
1962 Howard K. Smith
1961 John F. Kennedy
1959 Jim Hagerty
1958 Robert D. Swezey
1957 Dr. Frank Stanton
1956 Hugh Terry

John F. Hogan Distinguished Service Award

Named for the founder and first president of RTNDA, the John F. Hogan Distinguished Service Award recognizes an individual's contributions to the journalism profession and freedom of the press. The award is presented annually at the Excellence in Journalism conference and exhibition.

2021 Soledad O'Brien
2020 Yamiche Alcindor
2019 John Quiñones
2018 Pete Williams
2017 Jake Tapper
2015 Pierre Thomas
2014 Harvey Nagler
2013 Belva Davis
2012 Jorge Ramos
2011 Lara Logan
2010 Bob Priddy
2009 Barbara Cochran
2006 Christopher Glenn
2005 Don Fitzpatrick
2000 Stanley S. Hubbard, Jack Shelley
1999 Hugh Downs
1997 Walter Cronkite
1996 Sherlee Barish
1992 Terry Anderson
1991 Brian Lamb, Ed Godfrey, Bob Packwood, John Spain
1989 Gordon Manning, Dick Yoakum
1988 Vernon Stone
1987 Malvin Goode, J. Laurent Scharff
1986 Robert Byrd, Mark Fowler
1985 Ron Laidlaw
1984 Paul Davis
1983 Sig Mickelson
1981 Len Allen
1980 John Salisbury
1979 Rob Downey
1978 Col. Barney Oldfield
1974 Gordon Sinclair
1971 Charlie Edwards
1967 Ted Yates
1964 Robert Kintner
1962 David Sarnoff
1959 Frank Stanton

First Amendment Awards

The RTDNF First Amendment Awards honor individuals and organizations for their work on behalf of First Amendment freedom. They are presented annually at a gala in Washington, DC.

First Amendment Leadership Award

RTDNF presents this award annually to a business or government leader who has made a significant contribution to the protection of the First Amendment and freedom of the press.

2019 David Begnaud
2018 Gretchen Carlson
2017 Stanley S. Hubbard and Stanley E. Hubbard
2016 Rich Boehne
2015 Kathy Kirby
2014 David Lougee
2013 Robert Decherd
2012 Steve Capus
2011 David Barrett
2010 David Westin
2009 Google, Inc.
2008 Tom Curley
2007 Roger Ailes
2006 Hurricane Katrina Station Groups:
•	Belo Corp. (WWL-TV)
•	Clear Channel Broadcasting (WBUV-FM, WKNN-FM, WMJY-FM, WQYZ-FM, KHEV-FM, WNOE-FM, WODT-AM, WQUE-FM and WYLD-AM/FM)
•	Emmis Communications (WVUE-TV)
•	Entercom Communications (WWL-AM)
•	Hearst-Argyle Television, Inc. (WDSU-TV)
•	Liberty Corporation (WLOX-TV) and
•	Tribune Broadcasting (WGNO-TV)
2005 Jim Keelor
2004 Charles Grassley and Patrick Leahy
2003 Floyd Abrams
2002 Katharine Graham
2001 Don Hewitt
2000 R. E. "Ted" Turner
1999 Bob Wright
1998 Roone Arledge
1997 Robert L. Johnson
1996 Howard Stringer
1995 Tom Johnson
1994 James Quello
1993 Frank Stanton
1992 Allen Neuharth

Leonard Zeidenberg First Amendment Award

RTDNF presents this award annually to a radio or television journalist or news executive who has made a major contribution to the protection of First Amendment freedoms. It is named for the late Broadcasting & Cable senior correspondent, Leonard Zeidenberg.

2019 Shepard Smith
2018 Joe Scarborough & Mika Brzezinski
2017 Bill Whitaker
2016 Cami McCormick
2015 Ann Compton
2014 Lester Holt
2013 Candy Crowley
2012 Martha Raddatz
2011 Wolf Blitzer
2010 Brian Williams
2009 Cokie Roberts
2008 Bob Schieffer
2007 Bob Woodruff and Kimberly Dozier
2006 Gwen Ifill
2005 Ed Bradley
2004 Andrea Mitchell
2003 Judy Woodruff
2002 Sam Donaldson
2001 Jim Lehrer
2000 Diane Sawyer
1999 Christiane Amanpour
1998 Mike Wallace
1997 Jane Pauley
1996 Carole Simpson
1995 Walter Cronkite
1994 David Brinkley
1993 John Chancellor
1992 James Snyder

First Amendment Service Award
This award honors professionals in local or network news who work in an off-air, management, largely behind-the-scenes capacity.

2019 James Goldston
2018 David Rhodes
2017 Steve Jones
2016 Robert Garcia
2015 Perry Sook
2014 Robin Sproul
2013 Lloyd Siegel
2012 Marci Burdick
2011 Susana Schuler
2010 Harvey Nagler
2009 Susan Grant
2008 Paula Madison
2007 Philip Balboni
2006 William Wheatley
2005 Wendy Walker Whitworth
2004 Walter Ulloa
2003 Susan Zirinsky
2002 Fred Young
2001 Gary Wordlaw
2000 Lee Giles
1999 Marty Haag
1998 Betty Cole Dukert

First Amendment Award
This award honors an outstanding individual or organization which champions the First Amendment and press freedoms.

2019 CNN
2018 Meet the Press
2017 Mark Halperin and John Heilemann
2016 Jason Rezaian
2015 James Risen
2014 The Associated Press
2013 Twitter
2012 Jim Bohannon
2010 Barbara Cochran & Marcellus Alexander
2009 John S. and James L. Knight Foundation
2008 Richard Wiley

First Amendment Clarity Award
This award recognizes a journalist or group of journalists who go to extraordinary lengths to provide meaning and context to complicated news stories or issues of extreme public importance.

2019 NBC News/MSNBC 2019 “Road Warriors

First Amendment Defender Award
This award is presented to an individual or organization who takes a public stand in support of press freedom.

2019 Senator Amy Klobuchar
2018 Congressman Eric Swalwell
2016 Tim Tai

RTDNF Citation of Courage
This award is presented in recognition of distinguished service to journalism and extraordinary courage.
2019 Jamal Khashoggi
2019 Journalists of the Capital Gazette
2015 James Foley
2015 Steven Sotloff

RTDNF Lifetime Achievement Award
2019 Dale Hansen
2018 Robin Roberts
2017 Nina Totenberg
2016 Tom Brokaw
2015 Bob Simon
2014 Bill Plante
2012 Andy Rooney

Internal Awards
Barney Oldfield Distinguished Service Award 
The Barney Oldfield Distinguished Service Award was created in honor of RTDNF founder Col. Barney Oldfield, USAF (Ret.), and goes annually to an individual who, through their own efforts, has contributed to the growth and success of RTDNF.

Bob Priddy Award
Bob Priddy, one of RTDNA's most distinguished board members over 27 years of service stepped down in 2010. At RTDNA@NAB 2010, Priddy was honored with the newly introduced Bob Priddy award, which is now presented annually to board members who exemplify Priddy's distinguished and consistent service to RTDNA

Rob Downey Citation
The Rob Downey Citation is presented annually at RTDNA's International Conference and Exhibition. Named for the first executive secretary of RTDNA, the Rob Downey Citation recognizes exceptional service to the RTDNA board of directors.

Code of Ethics

The RTDNA Code of Ethics does not dictate what journalists should do in every ethical predicament; rather it offers resources to help journalists make better ethical decisions – on and off the job – for themselves and for the communities they serve.

The Code's guiding principles are truth and accuracy above all, independence and transparency, and accountability for consequences.

The RTDNA Code of ethics was most recently revised June 11, 2015.

Coverage Guidelines

RTDNA has also developed a series of coverage guidelines to assist journalists, newsroom managers and station management with both common and uncommon ethical and operational situations which may arise. The guidelines have been prepared by journalists, managers and subject-area experts, and have been vetted by the RTDNA Ethics Committee.

Training
The RTDNA and the Radio Television Digital News Foundation offer training opportunities to broadcast and digital journalists and students as well as to newsroom managers through resources including:

Leadership Guides
Crisis Planning Guides
The Diversity Toolkit
Ed Talks
Periodic webinars
Expert articles in the Daily Communicator e-newsletter
Annual Excellence in Journalism conference

Journalism Scholarships and Fellowships
RTDNA's educational and philanthropic arm, the Radio Television Digital News Foundation, recognizes outstanding students and young professionals pursuing careers in electronic journalism with a number of scholarships and fellowships offered each year.

Scholarships for Graduate and Undergraduate Students:
 The Ed Bradley Scholarship
 The Carole Simpson Scholarship
 The Pete Wilson (broadcaster) Scholarship for students from the Bay Area
 The Lee Thornton Scholarship (preference given to Howard University and University of Maryland students.
 The Presidents Scholarship in recognition of past RTDNA Presidents
 The Lou and Carole Prato Sports Reporting Scholarship
 The George Foreman Tribute to Lyndon B. Johnson Scholarship for students at the University of Texas at Austin
 The Mike Reynolds Scholarship
 The Abe Schechter Scholarship for graduate students (fund now retired)

Fellowships for Young Professionals (with fewer than 10 years as a professional journalist):
 The N.S. Bienstock Fellowship
 The Michele Clark Fellowship
 The Vadna and Colonel Barney Oldfield National Security Reporting Fellowship
 The Jacque I. Minnotte Health Reporting Fellowship

References

External links

Television organizations in the United States
Radio organizations in the United States
American journalism organizations
Journalism-related professional associations
Professional associations based in the United States
1946 establishments in the United States
Organizations established in 1946
501(c)(6) nonprofit organizations
Non-profit organizations based in Washington, D.C.